The 1978 Michigan State Spartans football team represented Michigan State University during the 1978 Big Ten Conference football season. Finishing the season on a seven-game winning streak, the Spartans won their fourth Big Ten Conference championship, which they shared with in-state rival Michigan. The Spartans finished number 12 in the final AP Poll.

Wide receiver Kirk Gibson caught 42 passes for 806 yard during the 1978 season. Gibson was inducted into the College Football Hall of Fame in 2017.

Quarterback Ed Smith led the Big Ten in 1978 with 2,226 passing yards, a 139.0 passing efficiency rating, and 2,247 yards of total offense. He was also selected as the most valuable player on the 1978 Michigan State team. He finished his career as Michigan State's and the Big Ten's all-time leader with 5,706 passing yards.

Schedule

Roster

Jon-Erik Hexum actor known for accidentally fatally shooting himself on the set of Cover Up.

References

Michigan State
Michigan State Spartans football seasons
Big Ten Conference football champion seasons
Michigan State Spartans football